The Reformists Coalition was the main electoral alliance of the reformists for 2008 Iranian legislative election.

The alliance was made up of some 30 political parties, and inspired by Mohammad Khatami. National Trust Party of Mehdi Karoubi however did not join the coalition due to conflicts with the mainstream reformists, and presented its own list of candidates.

References 

Electoral lists for Iranian legislative election, 2008
Reformist political groups in Iran